Arturo Alessandri Besa (31 October 1923 – 13 July 2022) was a Chilean lawyer and politician. Alessandri was member of his country's Chamber of Deputies and also of the Senate; he also was candidate for the presidency of Chile in the 1993 elections. He was the grandson of Arturo Alessandri Palma and the nephew of Jorge Alessandri, both presidents of Chile.

Death 

Besa died on 13 July 2022 at the age of 98.

References

1923 births
2022 deaths
Politicians from Santiago
Alessandri family
Chilean people of Italian descent
National Party (Chile, 1966) politicians
Independent politicians in Chile
Deputies of the XLVII Legislative Period of the National Congress of Chile
Senators of the XLVIII Legislative Period of the National Congress of Chile
Senators of the XLIX Legislative Period of the National Congress of Chile
Candidates for President of Chile
20th-century Chilean lawyers
University of Chile alumni